The Union of Creators and Entrepreneurs of the Cinema and Audiovisual Industries of Western Africa (UCECAO) is an organization for cinema professionals in West Africa.

The cofounder and president of UCECAO is the Malian film director Souleymane Cissé. The organization was created at meetings in Bamako, Mali, on 31 March 1996 and 13 January 1997. The organization is based in Bamako.

References

External links
 UCECAO website

African cinema
Arts organizations established in 1996
West African culture